Charles Vanderspar (1853–1877) was a rugby union international who represented England in 1873.

Early life
Charles Vanderspar was born on 1 July 1853 in Kandy, in Sri Lanka then known as Ceylon. He attended Wellington College in England.

Rugby union career
Vanderspar played for Richmond F.C. after leaving Wellington College. He was soon singled out by the England selectors and made his only international appearance, aged 19, on 3 March 1873 at Hamilton Crescent, Glasgow against Scotland.

Later life
Vanderspar returned to the land of his birth but died in Colombo on 9 April 1877. He is buried in St Mary's Church, Bogawantalawa, Sri Lanka

References

1853 births
1877 deaths
English rugby union players
England international rugby union players
Rugby union fullbacks
People educated at Wellington College, Berkshire
Richmond F.C. players
English people of Dutch descent